Johanna Stokhuyzen-de Jong (17 October 1895 – 28 October 1976) was a Dutch fencer. She competed in the women's individual foil at the 1924 Summer Olympics.

References

External links
 

1895 births
1976 deaths
Dutch female foil fencers
Olympic fencers of the Netherlands
Fencers at the 1924 Summer Olympics
Sportspeople from Leiden